{{Infobox school
 | name                    = Lexington High School
 | logo                    = Lexington High School (Massachusetts) Color Landscape Logo SVG.svg
 | image                   = 
 | alt                     = 
 | caption                 = 
 | motto                   = 
 | motto_translation       = 
 | address                 = 251 Waltham Street
 | city                    = Lexington
 | state                   = Massachusetts
 | zipcode                 = 02421
 | country                 = United States
 | coordinates             = 
 | type                    = Public high school
 | established             = 1854
 | founder                 = 
 | closed                  = 
 | district                = Lexington Public Schools
 | us_nces_district_id     = 
 | superintendent          = Julie Hackett
 | ceeb                    = 221190
 | principal               = Andrew Stephens
 | enrollment              = 2,273 (2021–22)<ref name=NCES>
Lexington High School (LHS) is a public high school located in Lexington, Massachusetts, United States, serving students in ninth through twelfth grade.

Campus

Lexington High School's facilities are divided into four buildings.

The Arts and Humanities Building contains most of the following departments: English, Social Studies, Fine and Performing Arts, and Physical Education. It also has the Donald J. Gillespie, Jr. Auditorium, the Ralph Lord Gymnasium, and a fieldhouse. Commons I and Commons II are used as cafeterias and meeting places. The library and the main administration office are also in this building. Thus, the Arts and Humanities building is informally and frequently called the "main" building by many students.

The Science Building contains the Science Department. The building contains the Science Lecture Hall (SLH), also known as the Independent Digital Learning Center (IDLC), which is used for math competitions, study halls, and detentions.

The World Language Building contains the World Language and the Health Education Departments.

The Math Building contains the Math Department, as well as the LABBB program.

The Quad is an outdoor common area. It is bounded by the Main building (on two sides), the Science building, and a covered walkway between the Science building and the World Language building.

Lexington High School's buildings suffer from lack of space and room for expansion as more students join the school every year. Currently, 100% of all science classrooms are overcapacity.

Demographics
As of the 2018–19 school year, LHS had an enrollment of 2,263 students, making it the fifth largest traditional high school in Massachusetts and sixth largest overall. With 179 classroom teachers (on a FTE basis), the school operates with a student–teacher ratio of 12.6:1. As of 2019, minority enrollment accounts for 54.1% of the student body, a roughly 275% increase over the past two decades driven by a 400% (+/- 10%) increase in the Asian and Asian-American population. There were 135 students (6.5% of enrollment) eligible for free lunch and 29 (1.4% of students) eligible for reduced-cost lunch.

Rankings

In 2021, LHS has been recognized by US News and Niche.com as the 2nd and 3rd ranked traditional (non-charter) public high school, respectively, in Massachusetts.

Academic competition

Debate
Lexington High School has a debate program consisting of three divisions: Lincoln–Douglas, Policy, and Public Forum, all taught as elective courses. LHS has won all three major divisions at the Tournament of Champions (TOC). It has also had winners or runners-up at National Catholic Forensic League, National Debate Coaches Association, and National Speech and Debate Association. As of 2019, Lexington's debate team has won both the Policy division and the Sweepstakes Award at the State Championship for the last 45 years.

Lexington won the Policy division at the TOC in 1994. A Lexington team won the TOC in the Public Forum division in 2007. Lexington won the Lincoln-Douglas debate division at the TOC in 2012. In 2020, Lexington again won the TOC in Lincoln-Douglas. Lexington has won top speakers awards at the NDCA in Lincoln-Douglas (2012) and Public Forum (2017), and at the TOC in Policy (1986, 1995).

The Director of Debate at Lexington High School is Sheryl Kaczmarek. In 2022, she was inducted into the Tournament of Champions hall of fame.

The Lexington Winter Invitational Tournament
The team annually hosts the Lexington Winter Invitational Tournament, nicknamed "Big Lex," with the categories of Public Forum, Policy, and Lincoln-Douglas. The event is a Tournament of Champions qualifier at the quarterfinal level and drew 1000 debaters in 2014 from as far away as California.

Math teams
Lexington has won the Massachusetts State Championship Math Meet 20 times between 1978 and 2013, competing in the large school division: 1978–1980, 1992–1995, 2000–2008, and 2010–2013. In the New England Championship Math Meet, Lexington has won seven championships: in 1994, 2002, 2003, 2006-2008, and 2012.

Lexington also participates in the Massachusetts Mathematics Olympiad (MMO), organised by Massachusetts Association of Math Leagues, where LHS students have succeeded in finishing in the top 20 statewide.

Lexington High School has sent teams to HMMT. Lexington won the competition in 1998 and 2001. Additionally, Lexington won second place in 2002 and 2009; fourth in 1999 and 2000; fifth in 2004, 2008 and 2012; sixth in 2003; seventh in 2013; and eighth in 2007.

The high school has also sent teams to the Harvard–MIT November Tournament (HMNT). Lexington won second place overall at the 2008, 2009, and 2011 iterations of the tournament. Lexington finished fourth at the tournament in 2010 and 2012.

The WPI Invitational Math Meet, which has been held continuously since 1988, has been won by Lexington High School 21 times, from 1988–1994 and 1996–2010. In 2011, Lexington finished in second place behind Northfield Mount Hermon School, and in 2012, Lexington finished in third place.

Lexington competes in the American Mathematics Competitions. In 2009, 5 students from Lexington High School qualified for the USAMO. In 2010, with the split of the USAMO format into the USAMO and the new USA Junior Math Olympiad (USAJMO), Lexington had five USAMO qualifiers, and five USAJMO qualifiers. From 2006–2011, Lexington had a total of 34 USAMO qualifiers, including four middle schoolers. In the first two years of USAJMO's existence, Lexington had nine total qualifiers, including two middle schoolers. Between 1987 and 2011, there were 76 USAMO qualifiers from Lexington High School, 7th most among all high schools in the nation.

The math department of the Lexington Public Schools system has received national merit through the Mathematical Association of America, as the Edyth May Sliffe Award has been won by 8 Lexington Public Schools teachers (5 from the high school, 2 from Diamond, and 1 from Clarke; all but the one at Clarke are listed under Lexington High School) a total of 11 times. Lexington High School also has the most two-time winners (3 teachers; no teacher can win it more than twice). Indian Woods Middle School, Shawnee Mission, KS (10) and Frost Middle School, Fairfax, VA (11) are the only other schools to have teachers win the award 10 or more times.

In 2010, the Lexington High School Math Team founded the annual Lexington Math Tournament, inspired by tournaments such as HMMT, and geared for middle school students.

Science teams
Lexington High School's FIRST Tech Challenge team, 2 Bits and a Byte, went to the FIRST world championship in 2012, 2014 and 2015, and again in 2018. In 2014, their roster reached 53 people, much greater than FIRST's recommended team size of 10 people. Lexington High School's all-female FTC team, The Parity Bits, was founded in the spring of 2014.

Lexington High School's National Ocean Sciences Bowl team won the National competition between 1998 and 2002, the first five years of the competition's existence. In 2009, the team won the regional Blue Lobster Bowl and returned to the national competition to win second place. The team won regionals in 2011 and repeated their 2nd-place performance at the national competition. The team won regionals in 2012 and placed 4th at the national competition. The team won regionals in 2016 and placed 6th at that year's national competition. The team also qualified for nationals in 2020-2022, winning 2nd place in 2021.

Lexington High School's National Science Bowl team has qualified for the national competition 17 times, more than any other school in Massachusetts, doing so in 1993, 1997, 2001, 2003, 2005, and in 2008-2019. The team won 2nd place nationally in 2009, losing in the final to Mira Loma High School. In 2010, the second team from Lexington also reached the semifinals of the regional qualifying competition before losing to the first team. In 2011, Lexington's B Team defeated Lexington's A Team in the regional finals to qualify for the National competition. In 2012, after defeating the B Team in the regional finals, Lexington's A Team outlasted 68 of the nation's finest science bowl teams to win the National Science Bowl competition. In 2013, Lexington placed 3rd; in 2015, 5th; and in 2016 beat Thomas Jefferson and lost to Clements to place 4th. 
The team was undefeated in the 2017 and 2018 national finals, beating TJHSST and North Hollywood High School to become the national champions.

Science Olympiad teams also exist at both Lexington High School, Diamond Middle School, and Clarke Middle School. The high school team won the state competition from 2001 to 2003, second place in 2009 and third place in 2010 at the state competition. The middle school team won second in 2010, 2017, 2018 and first in 2019, going on to place 34th at nationals.

Lexington High School's Envirothon team qualified for the national competition in 2008 and placed 7th.

Lexington High School's Invention Club won 3 gold medals at the regional invention convention in April 2017, and had its Captain win 3rd place at Nationals

Lexington High School's Computer Science Team won second place in the Senior-5 division at the 2009-10 American Computer Science League All-Star Competition. The team finished third and fourth in the same division in 2010-11 and 2008-09 respectively.

Quiz Bowl 
The Lexington Quiz Bowl team was founded in the 2012–2013 school year. The year of its establishment, the team placed 33rd at Nationals in the 2013 NAQT High School National Championship Tournament, and also placed 16th in the junior varsity division of the National History Bowl. In 2015, the team placed 5th overall at the National History Bowl. In 2016 a team placed 2nd overall at the National History Bowl, the highest ever finish at a national competition for a Lexington team, as well as finishing 5th overall at the NAQT High School National Championship Tournament, following it up with a ninth-place finish at the 2017 High School National Championship Tournament.

Model UN
Run as an after school club, Lexington High School's Model UN program is one of the fastest growing and most competitive programs in the nation. Lexington excels at regional conferences such as BUSUN, EagleMUNC, and DartMUN, in addition to various local high school conferences. Lexington won outstanding small delegation at EagleMUNC in 2016 and outstanding small at DartMUN in 2015. Lexington also sends delegations to NAIMUN (North American Invitation Model United Nations) every year, many of whom return with awards. Finally, Lexington hosts an annual high school conference, LexMUN, which is run entirely by the student body. Many public and private schools come from the Boston area to participate.

Chess
In 2008, the Lexington High School chess team made its debut in the high school section of the annual Massachusetts State Chess Championship, where it placed 4th overall in pursuit of the Hurvitz Cup. In 2009, the team placed 2nd in the freshman section of the annual National K-12 Scholastic Championship in Dallas, Texas. In 2010, the team placed 2nd in the Rhode Island State Championship.

The Lexington High School chess team has won the Massachusetts State Chess Championship and hoisted the Hurvitz Cup in 2011, 2013, and 2014.

School sports
Lexington High School offers the following sports:

Fall: August–November
Cross country: boys' varsity, girls' varsity, boys' junior varsity, girls' junior varsity
Football: varsity, junior varsity, freshman
Cheerleading: football
Field hockey: varsity, junior varsity, freshman
Golf: Co-ed varsity
Soccer: boys' varsity, boys' junior varsity, boys' freshman, girls' varsity, girls' junior varsity, girls' freshman
Swimming: girls' varsity
Volleyball: girls' varsity, girls' junior varsity, girls' freshman
Winter: December–February
Alpine skiing: girls' and boys'
Basketball: boys' varsity, boys' junior varsity, boys' freshman, girls' varsity, girls' junior varsity, girls' freshman
Cheerleading: co-ed basketball
Ice hockey: boys' varsity, boys' junior varsity, girls' varsity, girls' junior varsity
Indoor track: boys' varsity, boys' junior varsity, girls' varsity, girls' junior varsity
Swimming: boys' varsity
Wrestling: varsity, junior varsity
Spring: March–June
Baseball: varsity, junior varsity, freshman
Lacrosse: boys' varsity, boys' Junior varsity, boys' freshman, girls' varsity, girls' junior varsity, girls' freshman
Outdoor track and field: boys' varsity, boys' junior varsity, girls' varsity, girls' junior varsity
Softball: varsity, junior varsity, freshman
Tennis: boys' varsity, boys' junior varsity, girls' varsity, girls' junior varsity
Ultimate: boys' varsity, boys' junior varsity, girls' varsity
Volleyball: boys' varsity

Lexington High competes within division 1 of Massachusetts Interscholastic Athletic Association’s 4th district as a member the Middlesex League. Its Thanksgiving Day football rival is Burlington High School (Burlington, MA)l while other rivalries are more fluid and vary by sport.

Athletic titles and acknowledgements
Lexington High School sports teams have received the following accolades:
The girls' indoor track team tied for the first in the Massachusetts Division I State Championships in 2013.
The boys' indoor track team won the Massachusetts Division I State Championships in 1970, 1994, 2006, 2015, and 2016, and repeated in 2007. The Outdoor Track team won the Massachusetts Division I State Championships in 1970, 1976, 2006, and 2007 In 2007, the Lexington boys' outdoor track team captured both the Division I State Championship and the All-State Championship. In 2016, the team was the runner up to the All State title. The boys' running teams were also undefeated in the Middlesex League all of 2015-16 
The LHS girls' varsity softball team won the Massachusetts Division I State Championships in 2008 and 2009.
The boys' basketball team won four state titles in the 1960s and 1970s, including in 1978.
Former LHS football coach Bill Tighe was the oldest football coach in the country.
The LHS boys' varsity soccer team won the Massachusetts Division I State Championships for the first time ever in 2016.

Other details
In 2005, Fred Phelps, of Topeka, Kansas, and his church (the Westboro Baptist Church) protested the Lexington High School graduation because of the school's support of its gay-straight alliance. The group returned in 2009.

The Musket
The Musket is the school newspaper. Until 1965, the school newspaper was called The High-Spot.

Controversy
In 1997 The Musket ran into controversy by refusing to run an abstinence ad. The paper's First Amendment rights were maintained with the victory in Yeo v Town of Lexington, a case argued in the United States Court of Appeals for the First Circuit.

Notable alumni

References

External links

Buildings and structures in Lexington, Massachusetts
Schools in Middlesex County, Massachusetts
Public high schools in Massachusetts